The  Makaliyam Sreeramaswamy Temple is a famous temple of the Hindu Lord Sri Rama in Kochi, Kerala. The temple is located at Irumpanam along the Seaport-Airport Road.

The temple is said to be built by the Chera Dynasty. Several years ago, it is believed that a major fire incident had happened in the temple in which almost all gopuras and many structures were severely damaged. This is the new temple constructed by devotees later on and is now owned by Cochin Devaswom Board. The temple is recently renovated again with copper plated roofs & Dasavathara framed walls in panchaloha.

Lord Vinayaka and Lord Ayyappa are the Upa-Devathas. Lord Hanuman is also worshipped here without idol.

Here Lord Rama is considered to be in most powerful form after killing asura Khara younger brother of emperor Ravana and his huge army. It is believed that the deity is in the form of Lord Vishnu & Lord Siva consolidated power.

Hindu temples in Ernakulam district